Tell Me Who You Are (German: Sag' mir, wer Du bist) is a 1933 German comedy film directed by Georg Jacoby and starring Liane Haid, Viktor de Kowa and Olly Gebauer.

Cast
Liane Haid as Gilda Garden 
Viktor de Kowa as Frank Hesse 
Olly Gebauer as Lilo Lanner 
Fritz Schulz as Dr. Claudius Berger 
Otto Wallburg as Harry Reimers 
Paul Otto as Peter Schröder 
Paul Biensfeldt as theatre porter
Gertrud Wolle as Mrs. Schloderer 
Senta Söneland as Dr. Claudius Berger's landlady
Emilie Kurz as Harry Reims's aunt
Gerhard Dammann as theatre servant 
Bruno Arno as dancer

References

External links

1933 comedy films
German comedy films
Films of Nazi Germany
Films directed by Georg Jacoby
Tobis Film films
German black-and-white films
1930s German films